Bittersweet Symphony is a 2019 American-British drama film, written and directed by Jamie Adams. It stars Suki Waterhouse, Jennifer Grey, Poppy Delevingne, Craig Roberts and Griffin Dunne. Iris Evans (Suki Waterhouse) stars as a musician who has just completed her first soundtrack to a Hollywood feature and who finds her personal life getting complicated.

It was released in the United States on 25 June 2019, by Gravitas Ventures, and in the United Kingdom on 28 June 2019, by Pinpoint.

Cast
 Suki Waterhouse as Iris Evans
 Jennifer Grey as Eleanor Roberts
 Poppy Delevingne as Abigail
 Craig Roberts as Bobby Purser
 Griffin Dunne as Griffin
 Richard Elis as Uncle Keith
 Keiron Self as Leonard

Production
In November 2017, it was announced Suki Waterhouse, Jennifer Grey, Poppy Delevingne, Craig Roberts, Richard Elis and Griffin Dunne had joined the cast of the film, with Jamie Adams directing from a screenplay he wrote.

Release
The film was released in the United States on 25 June 2019, by Gravitas Ventures, and in the United Kingdom on 28 June 2019, by Pinpoint.

References

External links

American drama films
British drama films
2010s English-language films
Films directed by Jamie Adams
2010s American films
2010s British films